Cudini is a surname. Notable people with the surname include:

Alain Cudini (born 1946), French racing driver
Daniele Cudini (born 1963), Italian painter and sculptor
Mirko Cudini (born 1973), Italian footballer